Garden Island is an inner-city locality of Sydney, Australia, and the location of a major Royal Australian Navy (RAN) base. It is located to the north-east of the Sydney central business district and juts out into Port Jackson, immediately to the north of the suburb of Potts Point. Used for government and naval purposes since the earliest days of the colony of Sydney, it was originally a completely-detached island but was joined to the Potts Point shoreline by major land reclamation work during World War II.

Today Garden Island forms a major part of the RAN's Fleet Base East. It includes active dockyards (including the Captain Cook Graving Dock), naval wharves and a naval heritage and museum precinct. Approximately half of the major fleet units of the RAN use the wharves as their home port.

The northern tip of Garden Island is open to the public and contains the Royal Australian Navy Heritage Centre museum and an outdoor heritage precinct. Immediately south and above Garden Island on the Potts Point ridgeline is HMAS Kuttabul, the RAN's major administrative, training and logistics support establishment for the Sydney area. Although HMAS Kuttabul is administratively a separate facility to Garden Island, the two names are often referred to interchangeably.

Geography
Garden Island was originally an island in Sydney Harbour, but extension of the base and the construction of a dry dock in the channel between the island and the mainland have resulted in its connection to the mainland shore at Potts Point from the 1940s. The wharves of the naval base now stretch the length of the eastern side of Woolloomooloo Bay, from the suburb of Woolloomooloo to the end of the original island.

History

'Bayinguwa’ is the First Nations name for a small island at the end of Woolloomooloo Bay in Port Jackson Harbour.- It was renamed Garden Island in 1788 after it was planted in the first months of European settlement in Australia, to serve as a kitchen-garden by officers and crew of the First Fleet vessel . Initials carved into a sandstone rock on the site are believed to be the oldest colonial graffiti in Australia, comprising the letters "FM 1788," representing Frederick Meredith who served as Sirius steward. On 7 September 1811, ownership of Garden Island was declared to have transferred to the Governor's estate with produce dedicated for the exclusive use of Government House. The transfer had practical effect but due to an administrative error it was not formally registered, leaving the land in the legal ownership of the Navy, which successfully sought its return in 1866.

Sandstone fortifications, built on the island during the 1820s to protect Sydney from a much-feared Russian attack, also survive. Garden Island also boasts what is claimed to be Australia's first lawn tennis court. Built in 1880, it is still in use, although the lawn was replaced in 1960.

Captain Cook Graving Dock
Prior to World War II, the nearest sizable naval graving dock was at Singapore Naval Base; an  round trip for a potentially damaged warship. Consequently, in 1938, the Australian cabinet approved the idea of building a large naval graving dock. The cost of construction was predicted at around A£3 million. A far cheaper alternative, a second-hand floating drydock being sold by Southern Railway was considered early on. Despite the A£175,000 cost, the acquisition was opposed by Admiral Ragnar Colvin, as it would be expensive and difficult to maintain, would be unable to accommodate the draught of ships being acquired for the RAN, and would be incredibly risky to tow from England to Australia. Three sites were considered (one in Adelaide, and two in Sydney Harbour: Potts Point or near the Sydney Harbour Bridge), with Potts Point chosen as the cheapest location.

By September 1944, work had been completed to the stage where initial flooding tests could occur. On 2 March 1945, the British aircraft carrier  underwent an emergency docking: although the drydock was not due to open for another three weeks, the advanced state of building made the docking possible. The Captain Cook Graving Dock was formally opened by Prince Henry, Duke of Gloucester in his role as the Governor-General of Australia, with the ribbon cutting performed by the bow of the frigate . During the first year of operations, the drydock received the British battleship ; the 45,360-ton displacement warship is the largest vessel to use the dock.

Hammerhead crane

The hammerhead crane was built between 1944 and 1951 on the Fitting Out Wharf at Garden Island. The electrical and mechanical equipment was sourced from England, while the steel frame was fabricated in Sydney. Although officially declared completed in January 1952, the crane was operational from March 1951. It was last used in 1996.

In August 2013, the Federal Government announced the removal of the hammerhead crane, at an estimated cost of $10.3 million. Other options, such as preserving the crane as a heritage structure and tourist attraction, restoring it to working order, or converting it to a new purpose, were ruled out due to cost and the risk to security at the naval base. The removal was also seen as necessary to free up wharf space for the Canberra-class amphibious warfare ships. The Hammerhead Crane was the largest crane in the southern hemisphere on completion, and as of 2005, was still the largest crane in Australia. At the time of its demolition, it was only 15 cranes of that style worldwide. Removal was completed by November 2014, with some components preserved for heritage purposes.

Tunnel system
There is a tunnel system under Garden Island that was once used by the Royal Australian Navy. Within this tunnel system was a power station, offices and air raid shelters. This tunnel complex also had a command centre. Other tunnels also exist which headed further in towards Kings Cross.

The tunnels were used to move guns from one side of the island to the other. There are also older tunnels that were used to transport ammunition. The tunnels are now used for electrical wiring and communications.

The island also has a pit that was built in the 1800s and was used as a storage facility in case the island was ever attacked. The entrance to this pit has now been sealed.

Current usage

Dockyard
The dockyard facilities are today leased to and operated by the defence contractor Thales Australia, a part of the international Thales Group. They are used to service naval and civilian vessels.

Wharves

The various wharves that line Garden Island remain under the control of the navy and are used as the home port facilities for about half the Royal Australian Navy's major ships. The wharves on the western side of the island have sufficient depth of water to berth the largest United States Navy aircraft carriers.

Royal Australian Navy Heritage Centre

The Royal Australian Navy Heritage Centre was opened in 2005 and is the official museum of the Royal Australian Navy. It is located in the Public Access Precinct of Garden Island: a section at the northern end of the island opened in 2002 that includes several heritage buildings and structures, historical relics, and naval monuments. The museum's exhibits include the conning tower from one of the Japanese midget submarines that attacked Sydney Harbour in 1942. The heritage precinct is isolated from the mainland by the naval and dockyard facilities, with public access limited to the Sydney Ferries service between Circular Quay and Double Bay, with the Garden Island ferry wharf at the north end of the island. Private pre-booked bus groups are allowed to transit through the naval base and dockyard to the heritage precinct under strict conditions.

Other facilities
Various workshops and other buildings on the island are under the control of the nearby HMAS Kuttabul naval base and are used for training and other logistical purposes.

Proposed future usage

Since 2000 the global cruising industry has been building a number of very large ships, some of which were too large to berth at the Overseas Passenger Terminal at Circular Quay, although modifications were made in 2014 to accommodate some larger vessels. Some large ships are permitted to berth at Garden Island's naval wharves, initially on an ad-hoc basis, followed in 2012 by an agreement to permit three cruise ships to berth per year. There have been calls for increased cruise ship access to the naval wharves, with some suggesting that the RAN should relocate entirely. Replacing the naval base with a cruise ship terminal would also free up the island to be redeveloped as harbourfront residential housing.

The RAN and the Department of Defence have opposed these proposals due to the security risks and loss of capability the increased civilian presence would bring, and the enormous cost of replicating the existing capability at a new location (a 2013 defence white paper estimated a cost of over $6 billion, although naval personnel stated that this did not include the creation of support facilities like the graving dock, or relocating supporting companies and industries like Thales). Most of the potential locations for a replacement base would require large-scale, ongoing dredging works to allow access to large naval ships, and have narrow access channels which could be easily blocked in wartime.

Historic buildings and structures
The first naval buildings on the site were minor structures, but in the 1880s the Admiralty (with financial incentives from the Government of New South Wales) began to invest more heavily in the site as a base for the Royal Navy in the southern hemisphere. A number of sizeable buildings were constructed (several designed by James Barnet) providing accommodation, office space, stores of various kinds and a sizeable steam engineering factory. These were later taken over by the Royal Australian Navy, and most remain in use today.

Heritage listings 
Garden Island has a number of heritage-listed sites, including:
 Cowper Wharf Roadway: Sydney Harbour Naval Precinct

Gallery

List

References

Bibliography

 Keesing, Nancy (1975). Garden Island People. Sydney: Wentworth Books. Illustrated by Cedric Emanuel.

External links

 

 
Fleet Base East
Sydney localities
Buildings and structures in Sydney
History of Australia (1788–1850)
Maritime history of New South Wales
History of New South Wales
Tourist attractions in Sydney
Shipyards of New South Wales